"Just Like That" is originally an unreleased song by ABBA from 1982, and written by Benny Andersson and Björn Ulvaeus. The first official release of the song (in any form) is by Swedish brother and sister duo Gemini (Karin and Anders Glenmark), on their album Gemini (1985), produced by Benny and Björn with Anders Glenmark, and released as a 1986 single. Gemini's version is heavily rewritten compared to the ABBA original, with a slower arrangement and completely different verses.

The ABBA version has not been released officially. Recorded in 1982, as a track for a forthcoming ABBA album, Benny and Björn decided something was inherently 'wrong' with the track (verse and melody didn't match), and the track was discarded. When the album plans were cancelled in 1982, it was decided instead to release a compilation with two new singles. The new tracks on The Singles turned out to be The Day Before You Came and Under Attack, while Just Like That didn't even become a B-side.

Three demo versions of the ABBA recording have appeared on many bootleg records nevertheless, all originating from cassettes that were stolen from Björn's car in Stockholm around 1983. The three demos have been nicknamed the 'slow', 'na-na-na' and 'saxophone' versions. A snippet of one of the demos was made available in the "ABBA Undeleted" medley of unreleased tracks, included on the Thank You for the Music box set, released in 1994. Another unreleased track from the 1982 sessions, which was also included on the stolen cassettes, I Am the City, was released in 1993 on More ABBA Gold.

Back in the 80s, typical to how Benny and Björn worked, parts of the unreleased Just Like That were recycled for better use. A guitar solo/riff appeared as a melody line in Under Attack, ABBA's last single, already in late 1982.

A more comprehensive solution to Just Like That came in separating the song parts Benny and Björn felt didn't belong together, and in slowing down the tempo considerably. The song first re-emerged as a demo for Chess, the Andersson-Rice-Ulvaeus musical, only a year or two after the discarded ABBA version, rearranged as a dramatic instrumental ballad and discarding the original chorus melody. The song, now titled When the Waves Roll Out to Sea, didn't progress further in the production, however.

In 1985, a new version of Just Like That, which this time kept the original chorus but discarded the original verses, was released by Gemini on their first album. Gemini also performed the song live in the UK (with Benny playing the synthesizer) on Terry Wogan's chat show.

The original ABBA version of Just Like That was originally intended to be featured in the ABBA musical, Mamma Mia!, sung as a love duet between Sophie and Sky, but was discarded during rehearsals, as the song apparently did not advance the story.

Finally, the discarded verse melody found its home in Glöm Mig Om Du Kan, a version not far removed from When the Waves Roll Out to Sea, now with vocals by Per Myrberg, released on the Swedish version of the Chess musical in 2002, Chess på Svenska.

References

1982 songs
1986 singles
ABBA songs
Songs written by Benny Andersson and Björn Ulvaeus